David Cooper (born 1923) is an Indian former cricketer. He played one first-class match for Bengal in 1942/43.

See also
 List of Bengal cricketers

References

External links
 

1923 births
Possibly living people
Indian cricketers
Bengal cricketers